Aslan Semyonovich Doguzov (born 13 January 1991) is a Russian professional football player.

Club career
He made his Russian Football National League debut for FC Volgar Astrakhan on 27 July 2014 in a game against FC Anzhi Makhachkala.

References

External links 
 

1991 births
Sportspeople from Vladikavkaz
Living people
Russian footballers
Association football midfielders
FC Volgar Astrakhan players
FC Spartak Vladikavkaz players